The Battle of Gazipur was a military engagement on 4 and 5 December 1971, during the Bangladesh liberation war. It took place at the Gazipur Tea Estate near Kulaura, in the Sylhet District of what was then East Pakistan. The advancing Mitro Bahini (comprising Mukti Bahini and Indian Army) attacked the 22 Baluch Regiment of the Pakistan Army. This battle was a prelude to the Battle of Sylhet.

Preliminaries 

By the evening of 4 December 1971, the 5 Gorkha Rifles (Frontier Force) had fortified themselves at Kadamtal, a town close to the border opposite the Kulaura/Moulvibazar Sector of the Sylhet Division of East Pakistan. Small-scale attacks were planned to be employed to capture enemy territory. The 59 Mountain Brigade was to operate as a part of the 8 Mountain Division plan, possibly for thrust to Sylhet. The area had rolling hills with tea gardens dotting the area along the border. Further west, inside East Pakistan, low hills obscured most observations, and provided an excellent defensive and observational point into the Indian side of the border. The hills tapered off just east of Kulaura and the plains of the Sylhet division started from here. Kulaura was a communications center and rail head ten kilometers in depth, and was connected to Moulvibazar; along the Dharmanagar–Gazipur–Moulvibazar–Sylhet axis.

Objectives 

The task given to the 8 Mountain Division at this stage was:

The 59 Mountain Brigade was to capture the border posts along Dharmanagar–Gazipur-Kulaura and Dharmanagar-Jurithe axes
The 81 Mountain Brigade was to capture the border posts along the Shamshernagar-Fenchuganj-Moulvibazar axis
The rest of the division was to launch a multi-pronged attack against Sylhet

Pakistan's 313 Infantry Brigade, part of Pakistan's 14 Infantry Division, was located at Moulvibazar. Its 202 Infantry Brigade had moved to Sylhet, while its third brigade was covering Bhairab Bazar and the Ashuganj area further south. The 22 Baluch was defending the area near Sagarnal, Gazipur, Kulaura, and Juri with additional companies consisting of reconnaissance forces and EPCAF troops. One of this battalion's companies was deployed along the Dharmanagar-Juri axis with couple of border posts. Additional forces at that time included a border outpost of platoon size plus and unknown number of regular troops and EPCAF troops at Sagarnal, and a company at Gazipur with a platoon of scouts and a platoon of EPCAF troops. Lastly, there was the battalion headquarters at Kulaura and small reserve force  at Moulvibazar.

The Indian 59 Mountain Brigade plan detailed capture of the Sagarnal border outpost by 5 Gorkha Rifles (Frontier Force) as a preliminary operation. The 9 Guards were to capture Juri, and the 6 Rajput was to capture Gazipur and advance up to Kulaura. The 5 Gorkha Rifles (Frontier Force) would then act as reserve for the 6 Rajput's operation and be given additional orders as the battle progressed. It was planned that once Kulaura was secured, both brigades would once again have a single objective, to be determined later.

Attack 

At Gazipur, the Dharmanagar–Kadamtal–Sagarnal–Gazipur–Kulaura road passed through the area occupied by the Gazipur Tea Factory manager's bungalow and was overlooked by hills to the Southeast. The rows of the tea plantation created a maze and these alleys were covered by automatic fire. To its North was high ground with good observation of the area, with bunkers located around it. On 3 December 1971 around 21:00 hours, 6 Rajput attacked Gazipur but was met with stiff resistance. Before dawn it was apparent that the attack had failed and it was too late to employ reserves.

At this stage the 5 Gorkha Rifles (Frontier Force) were given orders to capture of Gazipur the next night; 4/5 December 1971. The 4 December was used for reconnaissance. With the attack launched the previous night, the Pakistanis were sensitive in the area, but had reorganized their defenses to prepare for an attack from any direction and were also supported by artillery guns. They also received reinforcements from Pakistan's 22 Baluch Company. In addition there was also a platoon-sized force supporting them in reserve. The Pakistani defenses were based on a built up area and well prepared bunkers. The 5 Gorkha Rifles (Frontier Force) planned to capture localities in phases, with Kela-Ka-Bagicha taken by Delta Company, the manager's bungalow by Alpha Company, and the factory by Bravo and Charlie Company. CO 2, Major Shayam Kelkar was made overall commander of the factory assault by Bravo and Charlie Company.

Delta Company was the first to reach its objective. By about 20:30 hours the advancing column reached the height immediately North of Kela-Ka-Bagicha and were attacked by Pakistani artillery and machine gun fire. Soon after this the company charged at about 20:45 hours. Hand-to-hand fighting ensued and casualties were taken on both sides. Delta Company succeeded in the fighting and captured Kela-ka-Bagicha. However, the company commander was injured during the attack. The next objective, the manager's bungalow, had been turned into a fortress with bunkers strewn around the structure. The firing was on fixed lines, covering gaps in the tea plantation rows and the approach from Kela-Ka-Bagicha. Because of a loss of radio contact Alpha Company's progress was not known and as such Bravo Company was tasked to capture the manager's bungalow. Alpha Company didn't know about Bravo Company being employed in its place from the planned direction. Luckily Alpha had taken a slight detour and angled their thrust on the rear side while Bravo targeted it from the Kela-Ka-Bagicha side. Casualties were suffered which included Commander Coy of Bravo Company, however Alpha and Bravo Companies succeeded in capturing the bungalow. However, during the assault, Major Shayam Kelkar was shot in the head and died while leading a charge.

See also
 Timeline of the Bangladesh Liberation War
 Military plans of the Bangladesh Liberation War
 Mitro Bahini order of battle
 Pakistan Army order of battle, December 1971
 Evolution of Pakistan Eastern Command plan
 1971 Bangladesh genocide
 Operation Searchlight
 Indo-Pakistani wars and conflicts

References 

Conflicts in 1971
Battles of Indo-Pakistani wars
Battles of the Bangladesh Liberation War
1971 in Bangladesh
December 1971 events in Asia
Kulaura Upazila
1971 in India
1971 in Pakistan
History of Sylhet